Climate Capitalism: Capitalism in the Age of Climate Change is a 2011 book by L. Hunter Lovins and Boyd Cohen. It presents positive stories and examples of how profit-seeking companies are helping to save the planet, and says that "the best way to rebuild America’s economy, cities and job markets is to invest in energy efficiency and renewable energy resources, whether climate change is happening or not". However, reviewer Gail Whiteman is unconvinced by the argument that naked greed and market forces will drive businesses to cut their greenhouse gas emissions.

See also
 Natural Capitalism: Creating the Next Industrial Revolution
 Merchants of Doubt
 Reinventing Fire
 Climate change controversy
 Climate change policy of the United States
 Media coverage of climate change

References

Climate change assessment and attribution
Low-carbon economy
Economics and climate change
2011 non-fiction books
Climate change books
Hill & Wang books